Espace Diamant (literally Diamond Space) is a group of French ski resorts, located in the Savoie and Haute-Savoie departments in the French Alps. The ski area has 185 km of slopes for all levels of experience, distributed between the altitudes of 910 and 2069 meters.  It is composed of the following ski resorts:
Crest-Voland: 16 ski lifts, 28 ski slopes (35 km), 80 km of cross-country skiing;
Cohennoz;
Flumet: 8 ski lifts, 20 ski slopes, 3 km of cross-country skiing;
Notre-Dame-de-Bellecombe: 19 ski lifts, 27 ski slopes, 8 km of cross-country skiing;
Praz-sur-Arly 6 ski lifts, 26 ski slopes (35 km), 10 km of cross-country skiing; and
Les Saisies in Hauteluce 34 ski lifts, 40 ski slopes (35 km), 80 km of cross-country skiing.

In addition to alpine skiing, other winter activities such as Nordic skiing, hiking, snowshoeing, and four-season tobogganing are also available. In summer, the Espace Diamant stations offer many activities such as horseback riding, mountain biking, hiking, alpine slides, paragliding, canyoning, and swimming in lakes.

Slopes 
32 green slopes
58 blue slopes
47 red slopes
10 black slopes
  slopes total

References

External links 
 Espace Diamant
 Detailed information on Espace Diamant

Tourism in Auvergne-Rhône-Alpes
Sports venues in Haute-Savoie
Tourist attractions in Savoie
Ski areas in France
Sports venues in Savoie